Roger Cosmonkey is a series of webcomics created by filmmaker Cory Edwards. The series premiered on May 16, 2011
and so far has consisted of two series; Roger Cosmonkey and Roger Cosmonkey 2: Mega-Pigeon.
Both series were posted on Edwards' Twitter account, and consisted of two tweets a day, over the course of ten days. Each tweet, called a "Twittersode", included a link to a single comic strip in the series.
It has been described as the world's first episodic Twitter series.

Edwards developed the idea shortly after his deal to write and direct a feature film of the television series Fraggle Rock expired. He found the process of creating the series for Twitter to be liberating since it gave him complete creative control.

References

2011 webcomic debuts
2011 webcomic endings
American webcomics
Twitter